Texas State Highway 3-A was one of the first original state highways proposed in 1917.

History
The original northern route of this road had split off at Houston and roughly paralleled it northward through La Grange and ended at San Marcos. By 1919, the route had changed somewhat by moving further north from La Grange through Bastrop and ending in Austin. By 1933, this routing had been renumbered as SH 71.

Texas State Highway 3-A was reassigned to an alternate routing number of SH 3, which was under construction in Seguin and upon completion would run between San Antonio and Waelder. A Parker through truss bridge was built to cross the Cibolo Creek between Seguin and San Antonio around 1932.

By 1938, the route was limited to the section between Seguin, Texas and Waelder, and in 1939 became the main routing of SH 3 when the original SH 3 was transferred to U.S. Route 90.

See also

National Register of Historic Places listings in Guadalupe County, Texas
List of bridges on the National Register of Historic Places in Texas

References

External links
 National Register of Historic Places Listings, 2011

Buildings and structures in Guadalupe County, Texas
Tourist attractions in Seguin, Texas
Texas state historic sites
Road bridges on the National Register of Historic Places in Texas
National Register of Historic Places in Guadalupe County, Texas
Metal bridges in the United States
Parker truss bridges in the United States